Marcelo Tejada (1952) is an Ecuadorian master painter of landscapes, human figures, marines, flowers, faces, collages and abstract objects.

Biography

The Artist
Since 1969, Marcelo Tejada has participated in many individual and collective expositions in Ecuador, Miami, Kentucky, Paris and Madrid. 
Marcelo Tejada organizes the experiences of geometric and cubist periods, and study early Bauhaus static group to feed their work.

Art career
1966 The first drawings and paintings.

1974 Honorable mention – Salon (Paris).

1975 Individual Exposition – OAS Salon.

1975 Collective – Mini gallery.

1976 Participation - Salón Nacional de Artes Plásticas.  CCE.

1976 Participation - Salón Nacional de Acuarela – Témpera – Dibujo – Grabado.

1977 Participation - Salón Nacional de Artes Plásticas del Banco Central del Ecuador.

1977 Participation - Salón Nacional de Artes Plásticas.  CCE Guayas.

1977 Honorable mention – II Salón de dibujo – tempera – acuarela- grabado.

1977 Participation - Salón Nacional Mariano Aguilera.

1978 Honorable mention - Salón Luis A Martínez. Ambato.

1983 Third award - Salón Nacional “José Abraham Moscoso.”  Latacunga.

1986 Participation - Bienal de Miami.

1988 Individual exposition.  Sponsored by FONCULTURA and BEDE.

1988 FONCULTURA and BEDE sponsored expositions in Spain and Fundación Guayasamín.

1988 Award Paris – Salon (Paris).

1989 Bi-personal Exposición:  E. Kingman y M. Tejada - dedicated to the President of France Francois Mitterrand and his entourage in the “Alianza Francesa”.

1989 Collective -  10 painters in the Metropolitan Express.  organized by the  “Asociación de Funcionarios Diplomáticos de Organismos internacionales.”

1989 Visit Francia y España.

1989 Collective - “Association mansion of Paris” sponsored by Asociación Franque-Equatorienne amites franco-ecuatorienes.

1990 Temporal exhibition  - “Atelier de Reliure d´Art. Encadrement.  Paris.

1990 Exposición individual Sala de Exposiciones “HOGAR CANARIO” auspiciado por la Embajada del Ecuador FONCULTURA -  BEDE, Madrid – España.

1997 Individual exposition - Collages – Gallery Hop Kentucky.  United States of America.

2002 Individual exposition - 120 works. Gallery MarsuArte. Quito

2002 to present. Permanent exposition -  Gallery MarsuArte. Quito

2005 to present. Individual exposition in the gallery studio “Marcelo Tejada”. Quito

References
  Gallery MarsuArte 
  Gallery Tejada

External links
 MarsuArte Gallery
 Gallery Tejada
 Flickr
 La hora

1952 births
Ecuadorian people of Spanish descent
Modern artists
People from Quito
Latin American artists of indigenous descent
Indigenous people of the Andes
20th-century Ecuadorian painters
Living people